Solidago ptarmicoides, the prairie goldenrod, white flat-top goldenrod or upland white aster, is a North American perennial flowering plant in the family Asteraceae. It is native to the central and eastern Canada (from New Brunswick to Manitoba) and parts of the United States (mostly Great Lakes region, the Northeast, the Ozarks, and the northern Great Plains, with isolated populations in Wyoming, Colorado, Oklahoma, and scattered locations in the Southeast. It has also been called upland white solidago, upland white goldenrod, and sneezewort goldenrod

Description
Solidago ptarmicoides is distinctive within the genus in having white to cream-colored flowers, in heads arranged in a flat-topped corymb rather than in an elongated raceme. One plant can sometimes produce as many as 50 small heads. Leaves are narrow and linear, often rather stiff. The species prefers dry, sandy soils and grassy meadows.

Conservation status in the United States
The plant is listed as endangered in Connecticut, Massachusetts, New Hampshire, North Carolina, and Tennessee, as rare in Indiana, and as presumed extirpated in Ohio.

References

ptarmicoides
Flora of Canada
Flora of the United States
Plants described in 1841